"Johnny Has Gone for a Soldier" is an Irish folk song.  The lyrics lament the sacrifices that men and women make in going off to war. Men would help by going off to war and women would help by sacrificing men and selling goods to buy military supplies. This folk song was popular throughout the American Revolutionary War. Although its meaning is known, its history is not. Peter, Paul, and Mary used the first and third verses of the song in the arranged song "Gone the Rainbow" from their second album Moving (1963).

Origins 

The tune and lyrics are very similar to the 17th century Irish tune "Siúil A Rún" on which the song is based.

Other versions
 American folk singer-songwriter Pete Seeger did a cover version available on his album American Favorite Ballads, Vol. 4.
 The gothic rock band Mors Syphilitica  did a version for their album Primrose (1998) performed by Lisa Hammer.
 American singer-songwriter and guitarist James Taylor and American violinist Mark O'Connor collaborated on a version together on the album "Heartland: An Appalachian Anthology" and was played at the end of each episode of the PBS series "Liberty! The American Revolution".
 Canadian singer-songwriter Old Man Luedecke recorded a version of the song for his album Proof of Love

In popular culture 
The song is heard several times in Ken Burns's 1989 documentary film The Civil War. It is performed by pianist Jacqueline Schwab and recorder player Jesse Carr.

The tune is also sung by actor John Tams' character Hagman in the 1995 TV movie Sharpe's Battle.

Notes

External links
 MIDI file of the tune.
 Link to a recording at the Smithsonian
 Link to an MP3 file for sale at Amazon.com

Songs about soldiers
Songs about the military
American folk songs
American Revolution
Year of song unknown
Songwriter unknown